The 2011–12 Pac-12 Conference men's basketball season began with practices in October 2011 and ended with the 2012 Pac-12 Conference men's basketball tournament from March 7–10, 2012 at the Staples Center in Los Angeles. The regular season began on the weekend of November 5, with the conference schedule starting on December 29.

This was the first season under the Pac-12 Conference name. In July 2011, two schools joined the conference. Colorado arrived from the Big 12 and Utah entered from the Mountain West.

Pre-season
 Pre-season media day was held on October 28, 2011 at L.A. Live's Nokia Theatre in downtown Los Angeles. 
 2011–12 Pac-12 Men's Basketball Media Poll: 
Rank, School (first-place votes), Points  
1.  UCLA (14) 421 
2.  California (13) 405 
3.  Arizona (11) 404 
4.  Washington 355
5.  Oregon 282 
6.  Stanford 255 
7.  USC 194
8.  Oregon State 188 
9.  Arizona State 148 
10. Colorado 119 
11. Washington State 119 
12. Utah 74

Rankings

 Three conference teams were ranked in the pre-season poll: Arizona No. 16; UCLA No. 20; and Cal No. 24.

Non-Conference games

Conference games

Composite Matrix
This table summarizes the head-to-head results between teams in conference play.

Conference tournament

 March 7–10, 2012 – Pac-12 Conference Basketball Tournament, Staples Center, Los Angeles, California.

Head coaches

Sean Miller, Arizona
Herb Sendek, Arizona State
Mike Montgomery, California
Tad Boyle, Colorado
Dana Altman, Oregon
Craig Robinson, Oregon State
Johnny Dawkins, Stanford
Ben Howland, UCLA
Kevin O'Neill, USC
Larry Krystkowiak, Utah
Lorenzo Romar, Washington
Ken Bone, Washington State

Post season

NCAA tournament
 March 15, 2012 - Colorado defeated UNLV 68-64 
 March 17, 2012 - Colorado defeated by Baylor 80-63
 March 14, 2012 – California defeated by South Florida 65–54

NIT
 March 13, 2012 – Washington def. UT-Arlington 82–72
 March 14, 2012 – Arizona defeated by Bucknell 65–54
 March 13, 2012 – Oregon def. LSU 96–74
 March 13, 2012 – Stanford def. Cleveland State 76–65

CBI
 March 13, 2012 – Washington State def. San Francisco 89–75
 March 14, 2012 – Oregon State def. Western Illinois 80-59
 March 19, 2012 – Oregon State def. TCU 101-81 
 March 19, 2012 – Washington State def. Wyoming 61-41
 March 21, 2012 - Washington State def. Oregon State 72-55
 March 26, 2012 - Washington State def. Pittsburgh 67-66
 March 28, 2012 - Pittsburgh def. Washington State 57-53
 March 30, 2012 - Pittsburgh def. Washington State 71-65

Highlights and notes

Awards and honors
 The Pac-12 Coach of the Year Award in both men’s and women’s basketball is now known as the John Wooden Coach of the Year Award.

Scholar-Athlete of the Year

Player-of-the-Week

 Nov. 14 – C. J. Wilcox, Washington
Nov. 28 – Maurice Jones, USC
Dec. 12 – Brock Motum, Washington State
Dec. 26 – Solomon Hill,  Arizona
Jan. 9	 – Carlon Brown,  Colorado
Jan. 23 – Faisal Aden,  Washington State
Feb. 6	 – Kyle Fogg, Arizona	
Feb. 20 – Justin Cobbs, California
 March 5 – Lazeric Jones, UCLA
 Nov. 21 – Jared Cunningham, Oregon State
Dec. 5	 – Solomon Hill, Arizona
Dec. 19 – Ahmad Starks, Oregon State
Jan. 2	 – Tony Wroten,  Washington
Jan. 16 – Terrence Ross,  Washington
Jan. 30 – Jared Cunningham,  Oregon State
Feb. 13 – E. J. Singler, Oregon
 Feb. 27 – Kyle Fogg, Arizona

All-Americans

All-Pac-12 teams
Voting was by conference coaches:
Player of The Year: Jorge Gutierrez, California
Freshman of The Year: Tony Wroten, Washington
Defensive Player of The Year: Jorge Gutierrez, California
Most Improved Player of The Year: Brock Motum, Washington State 
John R. Wooden Coach of the Year: Lorenzo Romar, Washington
FIRST TEAM:

All-Academic

First Team:

Second Team:

USBWA All-District team

References